The 1982 Gent–Wevelgem was the 44th edition of the Gent–Wevelgem cycle race and was held on 7 April 1982. The race started in Ghent and finished in Wevelgem. The race was won by Frank Hoste of the TI–Raleigh team.

General classification

References

Gent–Wevelgem
1982 in road cycling
1982 in Belgian sport
1982 Super Prestige Pernod